Intersection is the 20th and final album by singer-songwriter Nanci Griffith. It was released on 20 February 2012 on Proper Records/Hell No label. The album was recorded in her own home studio in Nashville and includes 12 tracks including five covers. This was Griffith’s last studio album before her retirement from the music business in 2013 and her death in 2021.

Track listing
All tracks composed by Nanci Griffith; except where indicated
"Bethlehem Steel" 
"Never Going Back" (Mark Selinger)
"Intersection" 
"Waiting on a Dark Eyed Gal" (Ron Davies)
"Hell No (I'm Not Alright)" (Nanci Griffith, Maura Kennedy)
"Stranded in the High Ground" (Nanci Griffith, Maura Kennedy, Pat McInerney, Pete Kennedy)
"If I Could Only Fly" (Blaze Foley)
"Just Another Morning Here" 
"Bad Seed" (Nanci Griffith, Maura Kennedy)
"Davey's Last Picture" (Betty Reeves, Robbin Bach)
"Come on Up Mississippi" 
"High on a Mountain Top" (Loretta Lynn)

Personnel
Nanci Griffith - vocals, acoustic guitar
Pete Kennedy - electric guitar, acoustic guitar, 12-string guitar, classical guitar, slide guitar, bass, organ, mandolin, ukulele
Maura Kennedy - acoustic guitar, tambourine, backing vocals, vocal arrangements, lead guitar on "Hell No (I'm Not Alright)"
Pat McInerney - percussion, backing vocals
Eric Brace, Peter Cooper - backing vocals on "Just Another Morning Here"
Robbin Bach - backing vocals on "Davey's Last Picture"
Aden Barton, Bailey Shelton, Bruce MacKay, Burt Stein, Nancy Lipsitz, Phil Kaufman, Robbin Bach, Talia Barton - choir on "Come On Up Mississippi"
Richard Bailey - 5-string banjo on "High on a Mountain Top"

References

External links 
 Lydia Hutchinson: Nanci Griffith: Intersection,  performingsongwriter.com
  Jo Cox: Nanci Griffith: Intersection,  mttm.uk

2012 albums
Nanci Griffith albums